The German Resistance Memorial Center is a memorial and museum in Berlin, capital of Germany.

History
It was opened in 1980 in part of the Bendlerblock, a complex of offices in Stauffenbergstrasse (formerly Bendlerstrasse), south of the Großer Tiergarten in Tiergarten. It was here that Colonel Claus Schenk Graf von Stauffenberg and other members of the failed 20 July plot that attempted to assassinate Adolf Hitler were executed.

Although the memorial is primarily intended to commemorate those members of the German Army who tried to assassinate Hitler in 1944, it is also a memorial to the German resistance in the broader sense. Historians agree that there was no united, national resistance movement in Nazi Germany at any time during Hitler's years in power (1933–45). Joachim Fest describes it as "the resistance that never was." Nevertheless, the term German Resistance (Deutscher Widerstand) is now used to describe all elements of opposition and resistance to the Nazi Regime, including the underground networks of the Social Democrats and Communists, The White Rose, opposition activities of the Catholic Church and other Christian denominations such as the Confessing Church, along with the resistance groups based in the civil service, intelligence organs and armed forces.

Design 
The visitor enters the museum from Stauffenbergstrasse through an archway, on the wall of which is inscribed: "Here in the former Supreme Headquarters of the Army, Germans organized the attempt of 20 July 1944 to end the Nazi rule of injustice. For this, they sacrificed their lives. The Federal Republic of Germany and the State of Berlin created this new memorial place in the year 1980." The visitor then enters the central courtyard, in which a statue of a naked man marks the place where the conspirators were executed. A plaque on a wall nearby commemorates this event.  In front of the statue, embedded in the ground, is a plaque that reads in German:

This translates as:

The entrance to the museum, which occupies three floors of one of the Bendlerblock buildings, is nearby.

Museum exhibits

The museum consists of a series of displays chronicling the history of Nazi Germany and of all those individuals and groups who opposed it, for whatever reason. All resisters are given equal respect. The museum, while seeking to show the many strands of German society which engaged in resistance activity, does not seek to disguise the fact that the great majority of Germans supported Hitler's regime and that there was never an effective resistance movement.

Particular attention is given to military resistance figures such as Claus von Stauffenberg, Ludwig Beck, Erwin von Witzleben, Günther von Kluge, Erich Hoepner, Hans Oster and Friedrich Olbricht. This underlines the modern German military doctrine, which holds that military officers have a moral duty which goes beyond the blind obedience of orders, and that those officers who plotted to kill Hitler were not traitors but heroes. The same point is made about other Germans who went into exile and assisted the Allied war effort against Germany, such as Marlene Dietrich.

The museum also makes a particular point of demonstrating how Hitler exploited anti-Semitism to gain power and lead Germany to ruin. Graphic examples of Nazi anti-Semitic propaganda are displayed. The museum reproduces many official documents, newspapers, posters, illegal handbills, private letters and photographs: more than 5,000 individual items in all.

References

External links

Gedenkstätte Deutscher Widerstand (English site)

German resistance to Nazism
Museums in Berlin
World War II museums in Germany
Monuments and memorials to the victims of Nazism in Berlin